The 2014 season is the Harrisburg City Islanders's 11th season of competitive soccer - its eleventh season in the third division of American soccer and its fourth season in USL Pro since the league was first created with the City Islanders as one of the original 10 founder-members.

Roster

Transfers

In

Out

Loan in

Competitions

Preseason

USL Pro

Standings

Results 

All times in Eastern Time.

Results summary

Playoffs
The Islanders finished 8th place at the end of the regular season earning the last playoff seed. The seeding would require the Islanders to play any post-season matches on the road. Despite being considered the underdog of the playoffs, the Islanders advanced past Commissioner's Cup winners, Orlando City SC in the quarterfinals, 4th-seeded Richmond Kickers in the semifinals, ultimately losing to Sacramento Republic in the 2014 Championship final.

U.S. Open Cup 

The Islanders entered the 2014 U.S. Open Cup in the second round against USL PDL club FC Sonic Lehigh Valley. Advancing through to the fourth round, the Islanders were knocked out of the tournament by their MLS affiliate Philadelphia Union in a close match where Philadelphia captain, Maurice Edu slotted an 89th-minute equalizer, bringing the match to extra time. Through extra time, Pennsylvania native, Andrew Wenger, struck twice advancing the Union with a score 3–1.

Statistics 

Numbers in parentheses denote appearances as substitute.
Players with names struck through and marked  left the club during the playing season.
Players with names in italics and marked * were on loan from another club for the whole of their season with Harrisburg.
Players listed with no appearances have been in the matchday squad but only as unused substitutes.
League denotes USL Pro regular season
Playoffs denotes USL Pro playoffs

Goalkeepers 
Referenced from USL 2014 Statistics

Honors 
 Week 3 Team of the Week: F Jason Pelletier Honorable Mention: M Pedro Ribeiro and M Clesio Bauque
 Week 5 Team of the Week: M Pedro Ribeiro Honorable Mention: D Richie Marquez
 Week 9 Player of the Week: M Morgan LangleyWeek 9 Team of the Week: M Morgan Langley and M Clesio Bauque Honorable Mention: D Neil Shaffer and F Matt Bahner
 Week 11 Team of the Week: M Jimmy McLaughlin Honorable Mention: M Morgan Langley and M Luan Silva
 Week 12 Team of the Week - Honorable Mention: M Pedro Ribeiro and D Richie Marquez
 Week 14 Team of the Week - Honorable Mention: M Cristhian Hernandez and M Jimmy McLaughlin
 Week 15 Team of the Week: D Coady Andrews Honorable Mention: M Danny DiPrima
 Week 16 Team of the Week: D Matt Bahner, M Jose Barril, M Jimmy McLaughlin Honorable Mention: M Morgan Langley and D Richie Marquez
 Week 17 Team of the Week: M Jimmy McLaughlin Honorable Mention: M Yann Ekra and M Garret Pettis
 Week 19 Team of the Week: D Matt Bahner and M Pedro Ribeiro Honorable Mention: M Yann Ekra and M Robbie Derschang
 Week 20 Team of the Week: GK Nick Noble and M Yann Ekra Honorable Mention: M Jimmy McLaughlin and M Garret Pettis
 Week 21 Player of the Week: F Pedro RibeiroWeek 21 Team of the Week: M Pedro Ribeiro, M Yann Ekra, and M Robbie Derschang Honorable Mention: D Richie Marquez and F Antoine Hoppenot
 Week 22 Team of the Week - Honorable Mention: M Robbie Derschang and M Leonardo Fernandes
 Week 23 Team of the Week: F Clesio Bauque Honorable Mention: GK David Flynn and M Yann Ekra
USL Pro All-League Second Team: D Matt Bahner

References 

2014 USL Pro season
Penn FC seasons
American soccer clubs 2014 season
2014 in sports in Pennsylvania